Kalkhügel is a district of Osnabrück, Germany with a population of roughly 5,900 residents. It is home to both a Protestant and a Catholic church (the Melanchthonkirche and St. Pius Kirche respectively). There is also a school centre (Schulzentrum) located in the district.

Location 
The Kalkhügel district is situated in the south-west of Osnabrück. It borders on the districts of Wüste, Innenstadt, Schölerberg, Nahne, Sutthausen and Hellern (in a clockwise direction, starting from 12 o’clock).

Literature 
Haubrock, O’Brien, Der Luftschutzstollen am Kalkhügel – Ein ehemaliger Luftschutzbunker in Osnabrück

References

Links 
 City of Osnabrück, Referat für Stadtentwicklung und Bürgerbeteiligung – statistics -, 4/2008 (PDF file, 1.49 MB)
 City of Osnabrück, Referat für Stadtentwicklung und Bürgerbeteiligung – statistics -, 11/2009 (PDF file, 35.4 KB)

Geography of Osnabrück